Miguel Mora may refer to:
Miguel Mora Barberena (born 1965), Nicaraguan journalist 
Miguel Mora Porras (1816-1887), Costa Rican interim president
Miguel Mora Gornals (1936-2012), Spanish cyclist
Miguel Mora (footballer) (born 1974), Spanish footballer